Hira Singh Gabria President of Shiromani Akali Dal BC wing. He was Jail & Tourism Minister in Punjab Government. He represents the Shiromani Akali Dal (Badal) political party.

References

Living people
Politicians from Ludhiana
Punjabi people
Shiromani Akali Dal politicians
State cabinet ministers of Punjab, India
1948 births